Zhai Hou (7th-century BC), was the queen consort of King Xiang of Zhou, who reigned from 651 to 619 BC. 

She was deposed after an affair with her brother-in-law.

References 

Chinese queens

7th-century BC births
7th-century BC deaths
7th-century BC Chinese women
7th-century BC Chinese people